The Latin Quarter (Quartier Latin) is a part of the 5th arrondissement of Paris, France.

Latin Quarter may also refer to:

Neighbourhoods

Europe 
 Latin Quarter, Copenhagen, a neighbourhood in Copenhagen, Denmark
 Latin Quarter, Aarhus, part of Midtbyen, Aarhus C, Denmark

Other parts of the World 
 Quartier Latin, Montreal in Montreal, Canada
 Fontainhas (quarter), the Latin quarter of Panaji, Goa, India
 Latin Quarter, the Little Havana neighborhood of Miami, Florida

Other 
 Latin Quarter (band), a British pop/rock band
 Latin Quarter (1929 film), a silent German film
 Latin Quarter (1939 film), a French film
 Latin Quarter (1945 film), a British film
 Latin Quarter, a 2011 American film featuring Dean Cain
 "Latin Quarter", a song by Harry Warren and Al Dubin from the 1938 film Gold Diggers in Paris 
 "Latin Quarter", a song by John Zorn from the 1990 album Naked City
 Latin Quarter (nightclub), New York City nightclub
 Quartier Latin International, a soukous band from the Democratic Republic of the Congo